Aaron ben Nathan Nata' of Trebowla was a Ukrainian Jewish author who flourished about the middle of the eighteenth century.

Career
Aaron ben Nathan Nata' of Trebowla published at Zolkiev, in 1755, "Shem Aharon" (Aaron's Name), a work containing halakic novellæ to the whole Talmud, and midrashic interpretations of the Pentateuch under the sub-title, "Netibot la-Shebet." He also published a commentary on Talmudic discussions on the Pentateuch, which bears the title "Maḳlo shel Aharon" (Aaron's Staff) and was published in 1768.

References

Talmudists
Jewish Ukrainian writers
18th-century scholars
18th-century Jews
18th-century Ukrainian writers